The 1894 Kansas gubernatorial election was held on November 6, 1894. Republican nominee Edmund Needham Morrill defeated People's Party incumbent Lorenzo D. Lewelling with 49.53% of the vote.

General election

Candidates
Major party candidates 
Edmund Needham Morrill, Republican
David Overmyer, Democratic

Other candidates
Lorenzo D. Lewelling, People's
I.O. Pickering, Prohibition

Results

References

1894
Kansas
Gubernatorial